Ticknock or Tiknock is a townland southwest of Sandyford in Dublin at the northeastern foothills of the Dublin Mountains.

There are a number of walking and biking trails in the locality, including in the Ticknock Forest amenity which is managed by Coillte. Described as one of Coillte's "most popular" and most visited sites, during 2020 Coillte replanted a number of sections of the commercial coniferous woodland at Ticknock with native deciduous trees.

Originally a largely rural area at the foot of Three Rock Mountain, a number of housing developments were built in the area (between the townland and the M50 motorway to the north) in the early 21st century.

See also
 List of towns and villages in Ireland
 Kilmashogue (mountain to the west)

References

Towns and villages in Dún Laoghaire–Rathdown
Townlands of County Dublin